Naojan also known as "Naojan Gaon" is a village under "Paschim Naojan Gram Panchayat", Tehsil Sarupathar, Sub Division Dhansiri of Golaghat District, Assam, India.The village is flourished beside Dhansiri river (world's most Zig-Zag river). Naojan Gaon has a Railway Station and Post Office.

Geography
It is located at an elevation of 113 m above MSL.

Location
National Highway 39 is 6 km away from Naojan Gaon.

References

External links
 Satellite map of Naojan
 About Naojan

Cities and towns in Golaghat district